Songs from an American Movie Vol. One: Learning How to Smile is the fourth studio album by American alternative rock band Everclear, released on July 11, 2000.  The album (along with its sequel, Songs from an American Movie Vol. Two: Good Time for a Bad Attitude) is a loose concept album inspired by lead singer Art Alexakis's second divorce. The first album is much more influenced by American pop music, especially from the 1970s, as well as being more "loving" in tone than the hard rock Good Time for a Bad Attitude. The album is dedicated to David Ridderhof and Louis Montoya.

Learning How to Smile is the band's second highest selling album ever with 1.28 million copies sold and a Platinum certification by the RIAA.  It is also the band's only album to debut in the top ten on the Billboard 200, where it peaked at number nine, and the last album by Everclear to sell over 500,000 copies.

Track listing
All lyrics written by Art Alexakis, all music composed by Alexakis, Craig Montoya and Greg Eklund, unless otherwise noted.

On the original 2000 release of the album, the divide between tracks 11 and 12 was in the middle of "Annabella's Song."  A reissue in 2001 corrected this error, as well as replacing the album version of "AM Radio" with the single mix and adding two bonus tracks: "Out of My Depth (single mix)" and "Rock Star."

Personnel
Credits are adapted from the album's liner notes.

Everclear
Art Alexakis – vocals, guitar, banjo, steel guitar, percussion, co-producer
Craig Montoya – bass, backing vocals, mandolin, percussion
Greg Eklund – drums, backing vocals, lead vocals on "The Honeymoon Song," ukelele, orchestra bells, percussion

Additional personnel
James Beaton – keyboard
Lars Fox – co-producer, percussion, backing vocals
Neal Avron – co-producer
Roy Lott – executive producer
Perry Watts-Russell – executive producer
Mike Kent – additional production and recording
Sean Cox – studio assistant
Andy Banton – studio assistant
Mike Ternyik – studio assistant
Charlie Paakkari – 2nd engineer
Frank W. Ockenfels III – photography

Charts

Weekly charts

Year-end charts

References

External links

2000 albums
Everclear (band) albums
Concept albums
Albums produced by Neal Avron
Albums produced by Lars Fox
Albums produced by Art Alexakis